George Wallington (October 27, 1924 – February 15, 1993) was an American jazz pianist and composer.

Early life
Wallington was born Giacinto Figlia (some sources give "Giorgio") in Sicily, and then moved to the United States (New York) with his family in 1925. His father sang opera and introduced his son to classical music, but Wallington listened to jazz after hearing the music of saxophonist Lester Young. He said that he acquired the name Wallington in high school: "I like to wear flashy clothes [...] and the kids in the neighborhood would say, 'Hey, look at Wallington!'" He left school at the age of 15 to play piano in New York.

Later life and career
From 1943 to 1953, Wallington played with Dizzy Gillespie, Joe Marsala, Charlie Parker, Serge Chaloff, Allen Eager, Kai Winding, Terry Gibbs, Brew Moore, Al Cohn, Gerry Mulligan, Zoot Sims, and Red Rodney, and recorded as a leader for Savoy and Blue Note (1950). Wallington toured Europe in 1953 with Lionel Hampton's big band. In 1954-60, he led bands in New York that contained rising musicians including Donald Byrd, Jackie McLean, and Phil Woods.

From 1954 to 1960, he led groups in New York that included newcomers Donald Byrd, Jackie McLean, and Phil Woods, recording as leader with these musicians for the Prestige and Atlantic labels.

In 1960, Wallington stopped playing music and moved to Florida to work in the family air conditioning business, citing the stress of endless touring. He returned to music in 1984 and recorded three albums, Virtuoso in 1984, Symphony of a Jazz Piano in 1986 and Pleasure of a Jazz Inspiration in 1992. He also performed at the 1985 Kool Jazz Festival in New York.

Compositions
His best-known compositions are "Lemon Drop" (which gained attention when played by Woody Herman in the late 1940s), and "Godchild" (one of the pieces played for The Birth of the Cool recordings led by Miles Davis).

Discography

As leader

As sideman

References

External links
MusicWeb Encyclopaedia of Popular Music

1924 births
1993 deaths
American jazz musicians
American jazz pianists
American male pianists
Italian emigrants to the United States
Bebop pianists
Blue Note Records artists
People from Cape Coral, Florida
Prestige Records artists
Savoy Records artists
20th-century American pianists
20th-century American male musicians
American male jazz musicians